Scopus: Journal of East African Ornithology is a peer-reviewed scientific journal on East African ornithology published by the Bird Committee of the East Africa Natural History Society. The journal was established in 1977 and the editor-in-chief is Mwangi Githiru.

See also
List of ornithology journals

References

External links 
 

Journals and magazines relating to birding and ornithology
Publications established in 1977
English-language journals